Edgar Elder was an American race car driver and racing car builder. Elder cars competed in one FIA World Championship race - the 1959 Indianapolis 500.

World Championship Indianapolis 500 results

References 

Formula One constructors (Indianapolis only)
American racecar constructors